Leta Manasulu is a 1966 Indian Telugu-language film directed by Krishnan–Panju and produced by A. V. Meiyappan under AVM Productions banner. The film stars Haranath, Jamuna and Kutty Padmini. It is a remake of the 1965 Tamil film Kuzhandaiyum Deivamum which itself was an adaptation of the 1961 film The Parent Trap, in turn based on Erich Kästner's 1949 German novel Lisa and Lottie. The film was released on 16 September 1966.

Plot 

Twins Padmini "Puppy" and Lalitha "Lalli" decide to reunite their separated parents.

Cast 
Haranath as Chandrasekhar "Sekhar"
Jamuna as Satyabhama "Bhama"
Kutty Padmini as Padmini "Puppy" and Lalitha "Lalli" (Dual role)
Relangi as Shambhulingam
Padmanabham as Sundaram
Jagga Rao as Jambu
G. Varalakshmi as Kanaka Durgamma
Geethanjali as Nirmala
Manimala as Janaki
Kanakam as Jalajamma

Soundtrack 
All songs composed by M. S. Viswanathan.
 "Andaala Ee Reyi" -
 "Andaala O Chilaka" -
 "Andaala O Chilaka" (Sad) -
 "Hello Madam Satyabhama"-
 "Kodi Oka Konalo"-
 "Makkuva Teerchava"-
 "Pillalu Devudu Challanivaare"-

References

External links 
 

1960s Telugu-language films
1966 films
AVM Productions films
Films based on Lottie and Lisa
Films directed by Krishnan–Panju
Films scored by M. S. Viswanathan
Indian black-and-white films
Telugu remakes of Tamil films
Twins in Indian films